The Butterworth filter is a type of signal processing filter designed to have a frequency response that is as flat as possible in the passband. It is also referred to as a maximally flat magnitude filter. It was first described in 1930 by the British engineer and physicist Stephen Butterworth in his paper entitled "On the Theory of Filter Amplifiers".

Original paper

Butterworth had a reputation for solving very complex mathematical problems thought to be 'impossible'. At the time, filter design required a considerable amount of designer experience due to limitations of the theory then in use. The filter was not in common use for over 30 years after its publication. Butterworth stated that: 

Such an ideal filter cannot be achieved, but Butterworth showed that successively closer approximations were obtained with increasing numbers of filter elements of the right values. At the time, filters generated substantial ripple in the passband, and the choice of component values was highly interactive. Butterworth showed that a low-pass filter could be designed whose cutoff frequency was normalized to 1 radian per second and whose frequency response (gain) was

If  = 1, the amplitude response of this type of filter in the passband is 1/ ≈ 0.7071, which is half power or −3 dB. Butterworth only dealt with filters with an even number of poles in his paper. He may have been unaware that such filters could be designed with an odd number of poles. He built his higher-order filters from 2-pole filters separated by vacuum tube amplifiers. His plot of the frequency response of 2-, 4-, 6-, 8-, and 10-pole filters is shown as A, B, C, D, and E in his original graph.

Butterworth solved the equations for two-pole and four-pole filters, showing how the latter could be cascaded when separated by vacuum tube amplifiers and so enabling the construction of higher-order filters despite inductor losses. In 1930, low-loss core materials such as molypermalloy had not been discovered and air-cored audio inductors were rather lossy. Butterworth discovered that it was possible to adjust the component values of the filter to compensate for the winding resistance of the inductors.

He used coil forms of 1.25″ diameter and 3″ length with plug-in terminals. Associated capacitors and resistors were contained inside the wound coil form. The coil formed part of the plate load resistor. Two poles were used per vacuum tube and RC coupling was used to the grid of the following tube.

Butterworth also showed that the basic low-pass filter could be modified to give low-pass, high-pass, band-pass and band-stop functionality.

Overview

The frequency response of the Butterworth filter is maximally flat (i.e. has no ripples) in the passband and rolls off towards zero in the stopband.
When viewed on a logarithmic Bode plot, the response slopes off linearly towards negative infinity. A first-order filter's response rolls off at −6 dB per octave (−20 dB per decade) (all first-order lowpass filters have the same normalized frequency response). A second-order filter decreases at −12 dB per octave, a third-order at −18 dB and so on. Butterworth filters have a monotonically changing magnitude function with ω, unlike other filter types that have non-monotonic ripple in the passband and/or the stopband.

Compared with a Chebyshev Type I/Type II filter or an elliptic filter, the Butterworth filter has a slower roll-off, and thus will require a higher order to implement a particular stopband specification, but Butterworth filters have a more linear phase response in the passband than Chebyshev Type I/Type II and elliptic filters can achieve.

Example

A transfer function of a third-order low-pass Butterworth filter design shown in the figure on the right looks like this:

A simple example of a Butterworth filter is the third-order low-pass design shown in the figure on the right, with  = 4/3 F,  = 1 Ω,  = 3/2 H, and  = 1/2 H. Taking the impedance of the capacitors  to be  and the impedance of the inductors  to be , where  is the complex frequency, the circuit equations yield the transfer function for this device:

The magnitude of the frequency response (gain)  is given by

obtained from

and the phase is given by

The group delay is defined as the derivative of the phase with respect to angular frequency and is a measure of the distortion in the signal introduced by phase differences for different frequencies. The gain and the delay for this filter are plotted in the graph on the left. It can be seen that there are no ripples in the gain curve in either the passband or the stop band.

The log of the absolute value of the transfer function  is plotted in complex frequency space in the second graph on the right. The function is defined by the three poles in the left half of the complex frequency plane.

These are arranged on a circle of radius unity, symmetrical about the real  axis. The gain function will have three more poles on the right half-plane to complete the circle.

By replacing each inductor with a capacitor and each capacitor with an inductor, a high-pass Butterworth filter is obtained.

A band-pass Butterworth filter is obtained by placing a capacitor in series with each inductor and an inductor in parallel with each capacitor to form resonant circuits. The value of each new component must be selected to resonate with the old component at the frequency of interest.

A band-stop Butterworth filter is obtained by placing a capacitor in parallel with each inductor and an inductor in series with each capacitor to form resonant circuits. The value of each new component must be selected to resonate with the old component at the frequency that is to be rejected.

Transfer function

Like all filters, the typical prototype is the low-pass filter, which can be modified into a high-pass filter, or placed in series with others to form band-pass and band-stop filters, and higher order versions of these.

The gain  of an th-order Butterworth low-pass filter is given in terms of the transfer function  as

It can be seen that as  approaches infinity, the gain becomes a rectangle function and frequencies below  will be passed with gain , while frequencies above  will be suppressed.

We wish to determine the transfer function  where  (from Laplace transform).

The  poles of this expression occur on a circle of radius  at equally-spaced points, and symmetric around the negative real axis. The -th pole is specified by

and hence

The transfer (or system) function may be written in terms of these poles as

.

where  is the product of a sequence operator.

Normalized Butterworth polynomials

The polynomials are normalized by setting  . The normalized Butterworth polynomials then have the general product form

Factors of Butterworth polynomials of order 1 through 10 are shown in the following table (to six decimal places).

Factors of Butterworth polynomials of order 1 through 6 are shown in the following table (Exact).

where the Greek letter phi ( or ) represents the golden ratio. It is an irrational number that is a solution to the quadratic equation  with a value of

The th Butterworth polynomial can also be written as a sum

with its coefficients  given by the recursion formula

and by the product formula

where

Further, . The rounded coefficients  for the first 10 Butterworth polynomials  are:

The normalized Butterworth polynomials can be used to determine the transfer function for any low-pass filter cut-off frequency , as follows

 , where 

Transformation to other bandforms are also possible, see prototype filter.

Maximal flatness

which is monotonically decreasing for all  since the gain  is always positive. The gain function of the Butterworth filter therefore has no ripple. The series expansion of the gain is given by

If the requirement to be monotonic is limited to the passband only and ripples are allowed in the stopband, then it is possible to design a filter of the same order, such as the inverse Chebyshev filter, that is flatter in the passband than the "maximally flat" Butterworth.

High-frequency roll-off

Again assuming , the slope of the log of the gain for large  is

In decibels, the high-frequency roll-off is therefore 20 dB/decade, or 6 dB/octave (the factor of 20 is used because the power is proportional to the square of the voltage gain; see 20 log rule.)

Filter implementation and design

There are several different filter topologies available to implement a linear analogue filter. The most often used topology for a passive realisation is the Cauer topology, and the most often used topology for an active realisation is the Sallen–Key topology.

Cauer topology

The Cauer topology uses passive components (shunt capacitors and series inductors) to implement a linear analog filter. The Butterworth filter having a given transfer function can be realised using a Cauer 1-form. The k-th element is given by

The filter may start with a series inductor if desired, in which case the Lk are k odd and the Ck are k even. These formulae may usefully be combined by making both Lk and Ck equal to gk. That is, gk is the immittance divided by s.

These formulae apply to a doubly terminated filter (that is, the source and load impedance are both equal to unity) with ωc = 1. This prototype filter can be scaled for other values of impedance and frequency. For a singly terminated filter (that is, one driven by an ideal voltage or current source) the element values are given by

where

and

Voltage driven filters must start with a series element and current driven filters must start with a shunt element. These forms are useful in the design of diplexers and multiplexers.

Sallen–Key topology

The Sallen–Key topology uses active and passive components (noninverting buffers, usually op amps, resistors, and capacitors) to implement a linear analog filter. Each Sallen–Key stage implements a conjugate pair of poles; the overall filter is implemented by cascading all stages in series. If there is a real pole (in the case where  is odd), this must be implemented separately, usually as an RC circuit, and cascaded with the active stages.

For the second-order Sallen–Key circuit shown to the right the transfer function is given by

We wish the denominator to be one of the quadratic terms in a Butterworth polynomial. Assuming that , this will mean that

and

This leaves two undefined component values that may be chosen at will.

Butterworth lowpass filters with Sallen–Key topology of third and fourth order, using only one op amp, are described by Huelsman, and further single-amplifier Butterworth filters also of higher order are given by Jurišić et al.

Digital implementation

Digital implementations of Butterworth and other filters are often based on the bilinear transform method or the matched Z-transform method, two different methods to discretize an analog filter design. In the case of all-pole filters such as the Butterworth, the matched Z-transform method is equivalent to the impulse invariance method. For higher orders, digital filters are sensitive to quantization errors, so they are often calculated as cascaded biquad sections, plus one first-order or third-order section for odd orders.

Comparison with other linear filters

Properties of the Butterworth filter are:
 Monotonic amplitude response in both passband and stopband
 Quick roll-off around the cutoff frequency, which improves with increasing order
 Considerable overshoot and ringing in step response, which worsens with increasing order
 Slightly non-linear phase response
 Group delay largely frequency-dependent

Here is an image showing the gain of a discrete-time Butterworth filter next to other common filter types. All of these filters are fifth-order.

The Butterworth filter rolls off more slowly around the cutoff frequency than the Chebyshev filter or the Elliptic filter, but without ripple.

References

Linear filters
Network synthesis filters
Electronic design